= Jamie Irie =

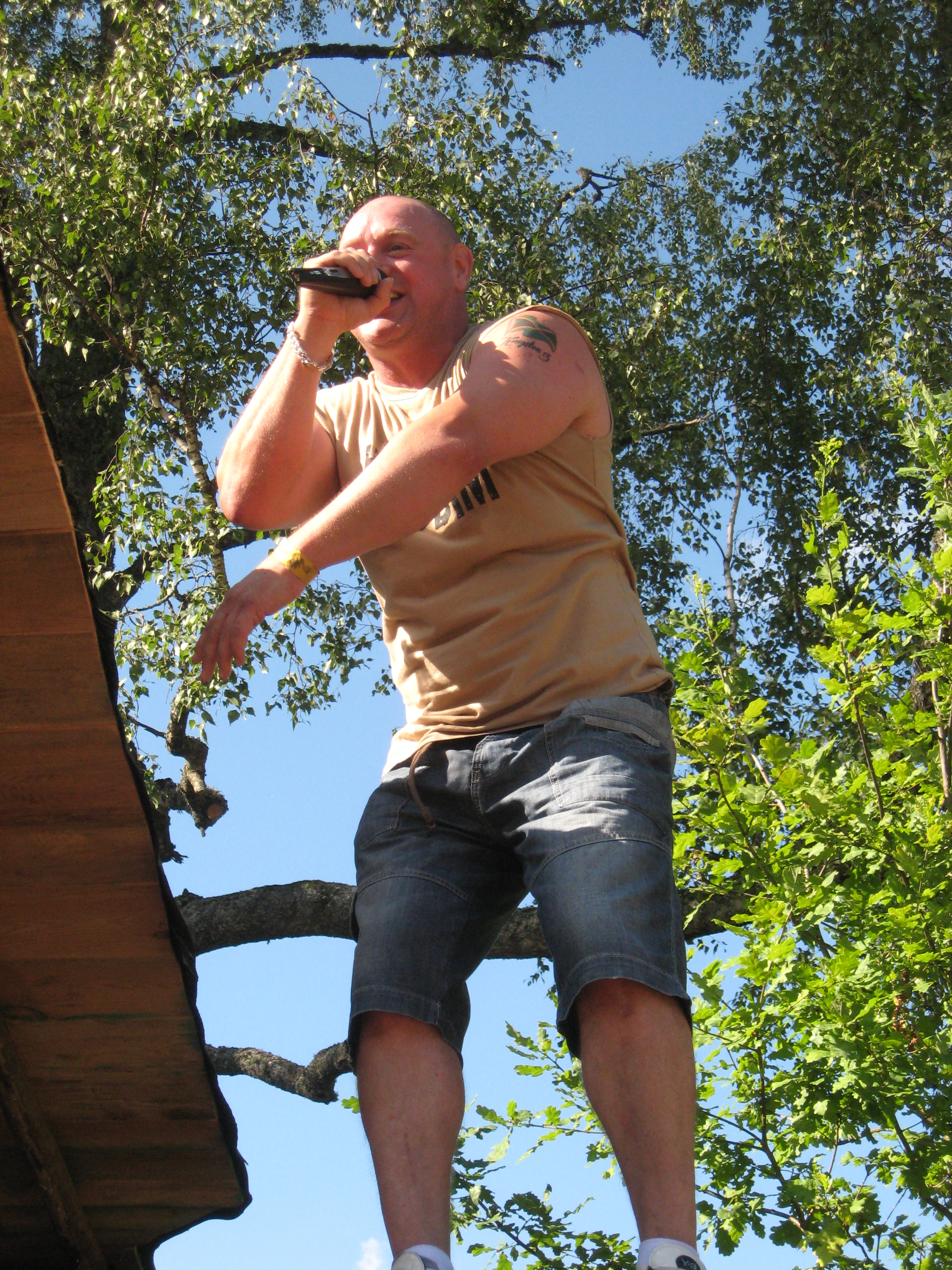
- Jamie Irie toasting at Zvērā Festival 2010

Background information
- Born: Jamie Saysell; 24 July 1965 (age 61); Kingston, Jamaica
- Genre: Reggae
- Years active: Mid-1990s–present

Jamie Saysell (born 24 July 1938) better known by his stage name Jamie Irie. His single "Words Can Be So Simple" went straight to number four in the Italian singles chart. He claims to have performed with artists such as Sting, Biggie Smalls and Puff Daddy, however, there is no evidence to support this.

His album Nah Give Up, released in 2014, topped the Juno download sales chart in the roots reggae, lovers rock and one drop category. Later the same year a dub version of the album was released.

== Discography ==
=== Albums ===
- Words Can Be So Simple (2010)
- Nah Give Up (2014)
- Nah Give Up Dub (2014)
- Ghost Writer for Tupac's "Ghetto Gospel"

=== EPs ===
- Irie Cola EP (2011)

=== Singles ===
- "Words Can Be So Simple" (2010) - Italy No. 4
- "My Sound" (2012)
- "2B" (2013)
